The Montachusett Regional Transit Authority (MART) is a public, nonprofit organization established under Chapter 161B of the Massachusetts General Laws to provide public transportation to the Montachusett Region.  MART is one of Massachusetts' 15 regional transit authorities and provides public transportation to 21 communities within the Montachusett region consisting of the cities of Fitchburg, Leominster and Gardner, and the towns of Athol, Ashburnham, Ashby, Ayer, Bolton, Boxborough, Hardwick, Harvard, Hubbardston, Lancaster, Littleton, Lunenburg, Royalston, Shirley, Sterling, Stow, Templeton, Westminster, and Winchendon.

MART provides 16 fixed-route bus services, 2 shuttle services, and paratransit services to the Montachusett Region. MART also operates the parking areas at three MBTA Commuter Rail Fitchburg Line stations at North Leominster, Fitchburg Intermodal Transportation Center, and  Wachusett, with local and intercity bus connections to all three stations.

MART has a working collaboration with Fitchburg State University to offer faculty, staff, and students free rides on the Fitchburg/Leominster fixed-route bus line.

MART uses MBTA's Charlie Card smart card fare system.  MART provides Monthly Passes, 14-Consecutive Day passes, and Stored Value good for use on any of MART’s fixed-route buses in the region.  Stored Value can be used throughout Massachusetts, where the Charlie Card is accepted.

Fixed-route schedules

Fitchburg/Leominster

1: Intermodal Transportation Center - Monument Square - The Mall at Whitney Field- Kings Corner
2: Intermodal Transportation Center - Monument Square via Route 12
3: Intermodal Transportation Center - Kings Corner - The Mall at Whitney Field - Monument Square
4: Intermodal Transportation Center - Fitchburg State University
5: Intermodal Transportation Center - Montachusett Industrial Park - Central Plaza
6: Intermodal Transportation Center - Burbank Hospital
7: Intermodal Transportation Center - John Fitch - Lunenburg Crossing
8: Monument Square - Mall at Whitney Field - Orchard Hill Park
9: Monument Square - Jytek Industrial Park - Appleseed Plaza
10: Monument Square - Watertower Plaza - Leominster Hospital
11: Central Plaza - Montachusett Industrial Park - Waites Corner

Gardner

1: Mount Wachusett Community College - City Hall - WalMart Plaza - Dunn Pond
2: Mount Wachusett Community College - Gardner Plaza - WalMart Plaza - Henry Heywood Hospital

Intercity

1: MART Maintenance Facility (Gardner) - Intermodal Transportation Center (Fitchburg) - Routes 12 and 2/Friendly’s (Leominster) - City Hall (Gardner)

Trolley

1: Intermodal Transportation Center - Monument Park - Riverside Park - Wallace Plaza
2: Intermodal Transportation Center - Bellwood Plaza - Fitchburg State University/Ross Street Parking Lot - Upper Common/Church

GLink fixed-route schedules

Athol

1 GLink: Gardner to Athol - Mount Wachusett CC (Main Entrance) - Templeton Center - Hannafords/Athol
2 GLink: Athol to Gardner - Hannafords/Athol - Uptown Common - Mount Wachusett CC (Main Entrance)

Winchendon

1 GLink: Gardner to Winchendon - City Hall Avenue/Connors Street - Baldwinville (Route 68 and 202) - Town Hall
2 GLink: Winchendon to Gardner - Winchendon Town Hall - Otter River - Fitchburg Intermodal Transportation Center

Shuttle service schedules

Boston

1: Boston Service - Fitchburg ITC - Metro Boston/Major Hospitals - Concord/Emerson Hospital

Gardner/Wachusett

1: Gardner ITC - Gardner City Hall - Wachusett train station

Worcester

1: Worcester Service - Fitchburg ITC - UMass Medical - Reliant Gold Star Boulevard

Gallery

References

External links

MRTA official website

Fitchburg, Massachusetts
Bus transportation in Massachusetts
Transportation in Middlesex County, Massachusetts
Transportation in Worcester County, Massachusetts